American Cup may refer to:

American Cup (gymnastics), an annual gymnastics competition in the U.S.
American Cup, a historical U.S. soccer tournament
America's Cup, a sailing competition